Sadamasu may refer to:

 Sadamasu, the previous name of Kunimasu Utagawa ( - 1850s), designer of ukiyo-e woodblock prints
 Minami Sadamasu, professional shogi player

Japanese-language surnames
Japanese masculine given names